Charles Fulton may refer to:
Charles William Fulton (1853–1918), United States Senator from Oregon
Charles J. Fulton (1860–1937), American state legislator from Iowa
Charles William Thomas Fulton (1906–1988), Australian architect
Charles B. Fulton (1910–1996), United States federal judge from Florida
Charles Fulton (minister) (born 1938), American minister who started YouthQuake